Birgitte Raaberg (born 26 September 1954 in Frederiksberg) is a Danish actress who starred in The Kingdom.

External links

 

Danish television actresses
Danish stage actresses
1954 births
Living people
People from Frederiksberg